
Gmina Imielno is a rural gmina (administrative district) in Jędrzejów County, Świętokrzyskie Voivodeship, in south-central Poland.

The gmina contains part of the protected area called Nida Landscape Park.

Villages
Gmina Imielno contains the villages and settlements of Bełk, Borszowice, Dalechowy, Dzierszyn, Grudzyny, Helenówka, Imielnica, Imielno, Jakubów, Karczunek, Kawęczyn, Mierzwin, Motkowice, Opatkowice Cysterskie, Opatkowice Drewniane, Opatkowice Murowane, Opatkowice Pojałowskie, Rajchotka, Sobowice, Stawy, Wygoda and Zegartowice.

Neighbouring gminas
Gmina Imielno is bordered by the gminas of Jędrzejów, Kije, Michałów, Pińczów and Sobków.

References
 Polish official population figures 2006

Imielno
Jędrzejów County